Francis Edward Weber (December 26, 1924 – October 27, 2022), better known as Hank Weber, was an American politician who was a member of the North Dakota House of Representatives. He represented the 22nd district from 1963 to 1964 and 1967 to 1980 as a member of the Democratic party. He also served a term in the North Dakota State Senate from 1965 to 1966. He was Assistant Minority Leader of the house from 1971 to 1973. An alumnus of Valley City State University, he was a farmer.

Weber died on October 27, 2022, at the age of 97.

References

1924 births
2022 deaths
North Dakota Democrats
People from Cass County, North Dakota
Farmers from North Dakota
Valley City State University alumni